Into the Black is the fourteenth solo album by guitarist/vocalist Richie Kotzen. The album has a parental advisory sticker on the front due to the song You Can't Save Me, making it the only Kotzen record to have one. You Can't Save Me was the first song he wrote for the album.

Track listing

Personnel
Richie Kotzen – primary artist, arranger, composer, producer
Alex Todorov – sound engineering, mixing, recorder
Dave Donnelly – mastering at DNA Mastering

References
 

2008 albums
Richie Kotzen albums